County Hall Football Club is a football club based in Wigston, Leicestershire, England.

History
County Hall joined the Leicestershire Senior League Championship in the 2016–17 season, finishing fifth. In 2018–19, County Hall finished third in the renamed Division One, gaining promotion to the Premier Division. County Hall entered the FA Vase for the first time in 2019–20.

Ground
The club currently play at Saffron Lane in Wigston, groundsharing with Aylestone Park. The club previously played in Glenfield, playing adjacent to Leicestershire County Council's County Hall, from which the club's name derives from.

Records
Best FA Vase performance: First qualifying round, 2019–20

References

Football clubs in England
Sport in Leicester
Football clubs in Leicestershire
Leicestershire Senior League